Optical film may refer to:

Thin film optics, a branch of optics that deals with very thin structured layers of different materials
Film, moving picture or movies
Photographic film